Exposed is a 1932 American pre-Code crime film directed by Albert Herman and starring William Collier Jr., Barbara Kent and Raymond Hatton. It was released in Britain by Butcher's Film Service under the alternative title of	Strange Roads.

Synopsis
A doctor is hired by gangster to work providing medical treatment to his gang. However, when the doctor's policeman friend is gunned down by the gang he sets out to expose them by gathering information on their activities.

Cast
 William Collier Jr. as Jim Harper
 Barbara Kent as Ruth
 Raymond Hatton as Marty
 Bobby 'Wheezer' Hutchins as Danny
 Walter McGrail as Johnny Russo
 Roy Stewart as Officer Dillon
 John Ince as Chief of Police
 Billy Engle

References

Bibliography
 Langman, Larry & Finn, Daniel. A Guide to American Crime Films of the Thirties. Greenwood Press, 1995.

External links
 

1932 films
1932 crime films
American crime films
Films directed by Albert Herman
1930s English-language films
1930s American films